Kisel may refer to:

 Gisel, a village in Iran
 Ivan Kisel (born 1998), Belarusian footballer
 Karol Kisel (born 1977), Slovak footballer
 Kissel, a Slavic dish

See also
 
 Kisiel (disambiguation)

Slavic-language surnames